The flag that serves as the symbol of Ursynów, a quarter of the city of Warsaw, Poland, is divided into 3 horizontal stripes: navy blue, yellow, and red, with the blue stripe being bigger than the remaining two. The flag was established on 14 February 1995, as the symbol of the municipality of Warsaw–Ursynów, and since 27 October 2002, serves as the symbol of the district of Ursynów, that replaced the municipality.

Design 

The flag of Ursynów is a divided into 3 horizontal stripes, that are, from the top to bottom, navy blue, yellow, and red. The aspect ratio of the height to the wight of the flag, was described in the establishing resolution as 100:99, although in practice, such proportions aren't used. Instead, the flag is usually given a shape of a wider rectangle, with the proportions equal 5:8. The proportion of the stripes to each other were described as equal 26:7:7, however, those proportion also remain unused in practice. Instead, the flag is usually presented with the blue stripe two times bigger than the remaining two stripes, with the proportion equal 2:1:1.

The yellow and red stripes reference the flag of Warsaw, while meaning behind the blue stripe reminds unknown.

History 
The flag was adopted on 14 February 1995, as the flag of the municipality of Warsaw–Ursynów. On 27 October 2002, the municipality had been replaced by the quarter of Ursynów, that continues to use the flag to the present day.

See also 
 coat of arms of Ursynów
 flag of Warsaw
 list of flags of the districts of Warsaw

References 

Flag
Flag of Ursynow
Flag of Ursynow
Flags of cities in Poland
Flags of gminas of Poland
Flags introduced in 1995
Flag of Ursynow